Laurynas Grigelis and Alessandro Motti were the defending champions but Grigelis decided not to participate.

Motti chose to compete with Simone Vagnozzi, but they lost to Alessandro Giannessi and Andrey Golubev in the quarterfinals.

Stefano Ianni and Potito Starace defeated Giannessi and Golubev 6–1, 6–3 in the final to win the title.

Seeds

Draw

Draw

References
 Main Draw

Tennis Napoli Cupandnbsp;- Doubles
2013 Doubles